Chen Jiashang may refer to:
Gordon Chan (born 1960), Hong Kong film director
Chen Jia-shang (1909–1972), the third Commander-in-Chief of the Republic of China Air Force